Tilt is the third studio album by Japanese musician Kahimi Karie. It was released on May 24, 2000 by Polydor Records.

Tilt features collaborations with Add N to (X), Arto Lindsay, Momus, The Olivia Tremor Control and Tahiti 80, among other artists. Three of the album's tracks were released earlier in 2000 on EPs by Karie: "Do You Know the Time?" and "Metaphors" on Once Upon a Time, and "Pygmalism" on Journey to the Centre of Me.

Track listing

Charts

References

External links
 

2000 albums
Kahimi Karie albums
Polydor Records albums